John Francis Wetzel (born October 22, 1944) is an American former professional basketball player and coach.  A 6'5" guard, he played collegiately at Virginia Tech and was selected by the Los Angeles Lakers in the 8th round of the 1966 NBA draft.  Over a seven-year career, Wetzel played for three teams: the Lakers, the Phoenix Suns, and the Atlanta Hawks.  He later coached the Suns during the 1987-88 NBA season.  He served as an assistant for several other teams, retiring from basketball in 2004.  Wetzel currently splits time in Tucson, Arizona and Maui, Hawaii.

References

External links
 BasketballReference.com: John Wetzel (as player)
 BasketballReference.com: John Wetzel (as coach)

1944 births
Living people
American men's basketball coaches
American men's basketball players
Atlanta Hawks players
Basketball coaches from Virginia
Basketball players from Virginia
Los Angeles Lakers draft picks
Los Angeles Lakers players
People from Waynesboro, Virginia
Phoenix Suns assistant coaches
Phoenix Suns expansion draft picks
Phoenix Suns head coaches
Phoenix Suns players
Shooting guards
Small forwards
Virginia Tech Hokies men's basketball players
Western Basketball Association coaches
Virginia Tech Hokies women's basketball coaches